Karl Lawton (born 29 November 1995) is an Australian professional rugby league footballer who plays as a  and  forward for the Manly-Warringah Sea Eagles in the NRL.

He previously played for the Gold Coast Titans and the New Zealand Warriors in the National Rugby League.

Background
Lawton was born in Murwillumbah, New South Wales, Australia. He is the younger brother of former Titans player Kayne Lawton.

Lawton played his junior rugby league for the Bilambil Jets, Tweed Coast Raiders and Burleigh Bears, before being signed by the Gold Coast Titans.

Playing career

Early career
In 2014 and 2015, Lawton played for the Gold Coast Titans' NYC team. On 5 May 2015, he re-signed with the Titans on a 2-year contract to the end of 2017. On 8 July 2015, he played for the Queensland under-20s team against the New South Wales under-20s team.

2016
In 2016, Lawton graduated to the Titans' Queensland Cup team, Tweed Heads Seagulls. In Round 17 of the 2016 NRL season, he made his NRL debut for the Titans against the New Zealand Warriors. Joining his brother Kayne Lawton as a first-grade player, they became the first set of brothers to play for the Titans at NRL level. His debut was cut short however, as he suffered a severe leg injury seven minutes into the second half.

In September 2016, Lawton was arrested and charged with assault and destruction of property over an alleged family dispute. The charges were later dropped and Lawton was cleared.

2017
Playing 11 games for the club in 2017, Lawton geared up for one of his better years of Rugby League, scoring his first career try in the Gold Coast Titans Round 2 loss to the Newcastle Knights at McDonald Jones Stadium Newcastle and his second a month later in his sides other loss to the Canberra Raiders at home. Lawton finished his 2017 campaign with 2 tries to his name and 11 first grade games for the club.

2018
On 1 March, Lawton was given an immediate release from the final year of his contract with the Titans to take up a two-year deal with the New Zealand Warriors, exactly one week before the 2018 Telstra Premiership season commenced. Lawton debuted for the Warriors in Round 9 against the Tigers, scoring two tries, and played 6 games in all for the team this season, scoring 3 tries.

2019
Lawton's first game for the Warriors in the new season was on 11 May 2019, in round 9, when he came on the field from the bench for an "explosive" 20 minutes, helping the Warriors to a 26-18 comeback win against the Dragons.  Picked for every game from then, on 26 June it was announced that he had signed a two year contract extension with the Warriors, taking him up to the end of the 2021 season.

2020
Lawton played 18 games for New Zealand in the 2020 NRL season as the club missed out on the finals.  On 21 December, Lawton suffered an Achilles injury at training which meant he would miss most of the 2021 NRL season.

2021
On 14 March, Manly-Warringah signed Lawton on a two-year deal.

Lawton made his club debut for Manly-Warringah against Parramatta in round 11 of the 2021 NRL season.  He scored a try and was sent to the sin bin during Manly's 28-6 victory.
Lawton played 16 games for Manly in the 2021 NRL season including the club's preliminary final loss against South Sydney.

2022
In round 8 of the 2022 NRL season, Lawton was sent off for a dangerous lifting tackle in Manly's 40-22 loss against South Sydney.  Lawton was later suspended for four matches over the incident.
On 7 June, Lawton was ruled out for rest of the 2022 NRL season with an ACL injury.

References

External links

New Zealand Warriors profile
Gold Coast Titans profile
Titans profile

1995 births
Living people
Australian rugby league players
Burleigh Bears players
Gold Coast Titans players
Manly Warringah Sea Eagles players
New Zealand Warriors players
Rugby league five-eighths
Rugby league halfbacks
Rugby league hookers
Rugby league players from Murwillumbah
Tweed Heads Seagulls players